Weston is a village in Nottinghamshire, England. It is located 10 miles south of Retford. According to the 2001 census it had a population of 312, increasing to 393 (and including Grassthorpe) at the 2011 Census.
The parish church of All Saints is 13th century. At the south-east end of the village are three 16th century tenements built with cruck trusses.

In 1870–72, John Marius Wilson's Imperial Gazetteer of England and Wales described Weston like this: 
"WESTON, a parish, with a village, in Southwell district, Notts; on the Great Northern railway, 3 miles NNW of Carlton-on-Trent. Post town, Newark. Acres, 1,690. Real property, £2,745. Pop., 380. Houses, 85. The manor belongs to Earl Manvers. The living is a rectory in the diocese of Lincoln. Value, £500. Patron, Earl Manvers. The church was recently repaired, and has a tower and spire. There are a Wesleyan chapel and an endowed school."

References

Villages in Nottinghamshire
Newark and Sherwood